Foakaidhoo (Dhivehi: ފޯކައިދޫ) is one of the inhabited islands of the Shaviyani Atoll administrative division and geographically part of the Miladhummadulhu Atoll in the Maldives.

History
Foakaidhoo was one of the islands damaged during the great cyclone of 1821 that hit the northern atolls of the Maldives. This was during the reign of Sultan Muhammad Mueenuddeen I.

Geography

Demography

References

External links
Information on Foakaidhoo from the Ministry of Atolls Development website

Islands of the Maldives